Mount Tully may refer to:

 Mount Tully, Queensland a locality in Southern Downs Region, Queensland, Australia
Tully Mountain (disambiguation)